Hector William "Harry" Evans (4 September 1879 – 23 February 1949) was an Australian rules footballer who played with Carlton in the Victorian Football League (VFL).

Evans returned to the Ovens & Murray Football League in 1900 and played in Excelsior's 1900 premiership.

Family
The son of George Alexander Evans (1841-1887), and Emma Lythgoe Evans (1848-1922), née Lasslett, Hector William was born in Shepparton on 4 September 1879.

Military service
He enlisted in the First AIF on 18 August 1914, and he served overseas in the 7th Australian Infantry Battalion. He sustained gunshot wounds to his left thigh and leg, on active service, that immediately required three operations; and, as well, he received treatment for the wounds' sequelae on several occasions post-war.

Although Evans had been allocated a block of land under the "Soldier Settlement Scheme", his service record shows that he surrendered the block in the second half of 1933.

Death
He died at Barnawartha, Victoria on 23 February 1949.

Notes

References
 First World War Embarkation Roll: Private Hector William Evans (705), Australian War Memorial.
 First World War Nominal Roll: Private Hector William Evans (705), Australian War Memorial.
 First World War Service Record: Private Hector William Evans (705), National Archives of Australia.

External links 

 
Harry Evans's profile at Blueseum

1879 births
1949 deaths
Australian rules footballers from Victoria (Australia)
Carlton Football Club players